Om Films is an American film production company founded by executive producer Niraj Bhatia and producer/screenwriter Daniel Burks in 2006. Om concentrates on feature films, but also produces shorts, documentaries, and web series, including the Producers Guild of America award-winning documentary Beats, Rhymes, & Life: The Travels of A Tribe Called Quest; Mortified Nation!; and Caucus, a look into the 2012 GOP caucus in Iowa.

Om's films have premiered at Sundance Film Festival, SXSW, AFI Dallas Film Festival, AFI Docs (where Caucus was selected as the closing night film), and have screened at many more including the Los Angeles Film Festival (where Beats won the Audience Award), São Paulo International Film Festival (where Beats won Best International Documentary), and MIFF.
Om's latest feature, Space Station 76 premiered at South by Southwest on March 8, 2014, where Sony Pictures secured all international rights.  Om Films, Inc. is based in Santa Monica, CA.

Filmography

References

External links 
 
 
 http://www.om-films.com/

Film production companies of the United States
Companies based in Santa Monica, California
Mass media companies established in 2006
2006 establishments in California